The 1911 Wimbledon Championships took place on the outdoor grass courts at the All England Lawn Tennis and Croquet Club in Wimbledon, London, United Kingdom. The tournament ran from 26 June until 8 July. It was the 35th staging of the Wimbledon Championships, and the first Grand Slam tennis event of 1911.

The men's singles entry reached three figures, when 104 players entered the Challenge Round.

Champions

Men's singles

 Anthony Wilding defeated  Herbert Roper Barrett  6–4, 4–6, 2–6, 6–2 retired

Women's singles

 Dorothea Lambert Chambers defeated  Dora Boothby 6–0, 6–0

Men's doubles

 Max Decugis /  André Gobert defeated  Major Ritchie /  Anthony Wilding 9–7, 5–7, 6–3, 2–6, 6–2

References

External links
 Official Wimbledon Championships website

 
Wimbledon Championships
Wimbledon Championships
Wimbledon Championships
Wimbledon Championships